Caldecote is a village and civil parish in Warwickshire, England, 2 miles north of Nuneaton and south of the A5. An ancient settlement, Caldecote is recorded in the 1086 Domesday Book as being in the ownership of the Bishop of Chester.

Caldecote Hall
The manor house, Caldecote Hall, was the home of Parliamentarian Colonel William Purefoy during the English Civil War and was damaged by Royalist siege by Prince Rupert in 1642. In the 18th century it was owned by Nathan Wright. The Hall was rebuilt in brick in 1880, for Henry Leigh Townshend, who was High Sheriff of Warwickshire in 1901. In 1924, the Hall was bought by the Church of England Temperance Society, for use as a retreat. In the 1950s, it was the home of St Chad's School but suffered financial problems and a severe fire in 1955. In 2005 it was restored and converted to private flats.

Gallery

Sources

Sheasby, Alan (1990) Skylark Fields: A Forties Childhood Exeter, Devon: Wheaton Publishers Ltd/Warwickshire Books,  (Includes a map of Caldecote and surrounding district)

References

Villages in Warwickshire
Civil parishes in Warwickshire
Borough of North Warwickshire